Slappy the Dummy is a fictional character and antagonist in the Goosebumps children's series by R. L. Stine. He is one of the series' most popular villains, the main antagonist of the Night of the Living Dummy saga and the mascot of the franchise. He is also the main antagonist of the Goosebumps movie and its sequel, where Stine describes him as a "ventriloquist's dummy with a serious Napoleonic complex". He comes alive by these words: "Karru Marri Odonna Loma Molanu Karrano" (which roughly translates to "You and I are one now"), and they can be found on a sheet of paper in Slappy's jacket pocket. After coming to life, Slappy will try to make the person who brought him to life serve him as a slave, to the point that he will frame that person for bad things that he does.

Inspiration
According to R. L. Stine, Slappy was inspired by the literary classic The Adventures of Pinocchio. He liked the book's idea of a wooden puppet coming to life, so he created Slappy.

Magic, a 1978 horror film where a dummy is thought to commit evil acts, was another one of R. L. Stine's inspirations for Slappy. In the television adaptation of the books, Slappy has the same sounding voice as Fats, the dummy from Magic with the voice of Anthony Hopkins.

Notable appearances in novels

He also appears in his own series Goosebumps SlappyWorld, where he serves as the narrator.

Appearances beyond the books
Slappy has also been made into an actual ventriloquist doll available from major retailers. He was first manufactured by Goldberger Doll corporation after a nine-year-old boy from Long Island sent them a letter suggesting the idea in 1998. There is also a mask and a full costume available for sale. Night of the Living Dummy III and Bride of the Living Dummy have also been adapted for VHS and DVD; the second on DVD includes Bride of the Living Dummy.

Authors Douglas Preston and Lincoln Child posted an announcement via their Facebook status:

This was published on 30 September 2014 as "Gaslighted: Slappy the Ventriloquist Dummy vs. Aloysius Pendergast" in the anthology Face Off edited by David Baldacci.

In other media
Cal Dodd (Cathal J. Dodd) was the voice of Slappy for the 4 seasons of the television series. Cal voiced the theme song for the series as well as several DVDs.   
Slappy was performed on set and voiced by puppeteer Ron Stefaniuk who appeared in four episodes:
"Night of the Living Dummy II"; episode 10, aired 2 January 1996
"Night of the Living Dummy III Part I"; episode 43, aired 20 July 1997
"Night of the Living Dummy III Part II"; episode 44, aired 20 July 1997
"Bride of the Living Dummy"; episode 60, aired 14 February 1998

The original Night of the Living Dummy story was never adapted to television, nor were the six post-Bride stories.

He is the main antagonist in the 2015 Goosebumps film, where he was voiced by Jack Black, who also is R. L. Stine, and the Invisible Boy, from My Best Friend is Invisible, with Avery Lee Jones doing the puppetry of the character (Jones also did the voice of Slappy for promotional material for the film), assisted by Ironhead Studio's Jake McKinnon.
Slappy is voiced by actor Mick Wingert in the sequel, with Jones once again puppeteering him (this time assisted by technicians from Legacy Effects) and voicing him for promotional material, as well as for a few lines of dialogue and all of his laughs in the final film.

Slappy appears in the comic book series made by IDW and appears in the Goosebumps graphix.

Slappy appears in the Goosebumps video game Horror Town.

The characters the Bensons, a group of non-speaking ventriloquist's dummies in Pixar's Toy Story 4, are inspired by Slappy.

See also
"The Rival Dummy", a 1928 short story by Ben Hecht
The Great Gabbo, a 1929 film inspired by "The Rival Dummy"
Dead of Night, a 1948 horror film with a ventriloquist's dummy sequence
Studio One episode 22 (season 2 episode 2) adapted "The Rival Dummy" on 19 September 1949
"The Dummy", a 1962 episode of The Twilight Zone
"Caesar and Me", a 1963 episode of The Twilight Zone about an evil ventriloquist dummy who can speak and walk on his own
Arnold Wesker a.k.a. the Ventriloquist, a comic book supervillain who unconsciously expresses aggression through his ventriloquist's dummy, Scarface
Magic, a 1978 psychological horror movie starring Anthony Hopkins as a ventriloquist.

References

External links
Slappy the Dummy - Official Site

Fictional dolls and dummies
Fictional characters with superhuman strength
Literary characters introduced in 1993
Male literary villains
Fictional characters who can teleport
Fictional monsters
Horror film villains
Male horror film villains
Male characters in film
Male characters in literature
Male characters in television
Video game bosses
Fictional characters who use magic
Male film villains